Mervi is a given name. Notable people with the name include:

Mervi Pohjanheimo (born 1945), Finnish television director and producer
Mervi Väisänen (born 1973), Finnish ski-orienteering competitor

See also
Mervin (given name)